Trones may refer to:

Places

Norway
Trones, Nordland, a village in Beiarn municipality in Nordland county
Trones, Namsskogan, a village in Namsskogan municipality in Trøndelag county
Trones, Verdal, a village area and headland in Verdal municipality in Trøndelag county
Trones, Vestland, a village in Ullensvang municipality in Vestland county
Trones og Sentrum, a borough in the city of Sandnes in Rogaland county

Spain
Trones (Asturias), a parish council in Asturias

See also
Trone (disambiguation)